The Nahant Invitation was an invitational mens clay court tournament established in 1885 at the Nahant Club, Nahant, Massachusetts, United States, that ran till 1904.

History
The Nahant Invitation was a clay court tournament established in 1885 at the Nahant Club, Nahant, Massachusetts, United States, that ran till 1904.

Finals

Men's Singles
 1885— Joseph Sill Clark Sr. def. ?
 1903— Laurie Doherty def. William Jackson Clothier, 6–4, 6–0.
 1904— William Jackson Clothier def.  William Larned, 7–5, 6–4, 2–6, 6–3.

Venue
The tournament was played on the courts of the Nahant Club.

References

Clay court tennis tournaments
Defunct tennis tournaments in the United States